Northeast Action (NEAction) is a United States political organization, with offices in Connecticut and Massachusetts, working in New England and New York State. It was founded in 1984 as part of the Citizen Action network. The group promotes democracy, social justice, and attempts to address cultural and racial issues.

It works with its six affiliated organizations on strategic direction and policy development, technical support and staff and leadership training. Its affiliates are involved in a wide variety of issue campaigns, including campaign finance reform, health care reform, corporate accountability, and leadership training for empowerment in communities of color.  The group publishes a variety of literature. NEAction's executive director is Cynthia Ward.

References

External links
 Northeast Action Homepage (official)
 Northeast Action affiliates:
 Citizen Action of New York
 Commonwealth Coalition (Massachusetts)
 Connecticut Citizen Action Group
 Dirigo Alliance (Maine)
 Maine Citizen Leadership Fund
 Maine People's Alliance
 Mass Voters for Clean Elections
 New Hampshire Citizens Alliance
 Ocean State Action (Rhode Island)
 Vermont Public Interest Research Group (not officially affiliated)

Political advocacy groups in the United States